Fred Emmett Woods IV (born 1956) is a Brigham Young University professor of Latter-day Saint Church History and Mormon Doctrine, an author specializing in Mormon migration and the Globalization of Mormonism.

Biography

Early life
Woods was born and grew up in Southern California.  He was baptized a member of the Church of Jesus Christ of Latter-day Saints at age 20 and about a year later left on a mission to Australia.  After returning from his mission he began studying at Ricks College, where he met his wife, JoAnna Merrill.  They are now the parents of five children.

Education
After completing his associate degree at Ricks, Woods earned a bachelor's degree from Brigham Young University, and received a Ph.D. in 1991 from the University of Utah.  His doctoral dissertation was entitled Water and Storm Polemics against Baalism in the Deuteronomic History.  His Ph.D. was in Mideastern Studies with an emphasis in Hebrew Bible.

Since that time Woods has focused his studies primarily on 19th century Mormon history.  He has had research fellowships with both the Mariners' Museum in Newport News, Virginia and the St. Louis Mercantile Library at the University of Missouri-St. Louis.

Teaching career
Woods began as an instructor in the LDS seminaries in Provo and Orem.  He later served as an Institute of Religion instructor and director in both Southern California and in Boulder, Colorado.  From 1993 to 1998 he was a professor of religion at Ricks College, and since 1998 he has been a professor of religion at Brigham Young University.

While at BYU Woods has taken leaves of absence, once in 2001 to be a visiting professor at the University of Missouri at St. Louis, and in the summers of 2004, 2005 and 2006 to be a visiting professor at Brigham Young University-Hawaii.

From 2005 until 2010 he held the Richard L. Evans Chair of Religious Understanding in BYU's College of Religion.

Publications
Possibly the most widely used publication by Fred Woods is his CD the "Mormon Emigration Index", a compilation of passenger lists and primary source excerpts of the Mormon passengers on ships from 1840 to 1890. He has expanded and updated it as a website.

Woods has also written or edited several books:
 Water and Storm Polemics Against Baalism in the Deuteronomic History (1994, Peter Lang Pub Inc,  / )
 I Sailed to Zion, with Susan Arrington Madsen (2000, Deseret Book,  / ) (review from AML)
 Gathering to Nauvoo (2002, Covenant Communications,  / )
 Co-author of Unto Every Nation: Gospel Light Reaches Every Land (2003, Deseret Book,  / )
 A Gamble in the Desert: The Mormon Mission in Las Vegas (1855–1857) (2005, Mormon Historic Sites Foundation)
 Fire on Ice: The Story of Icelandic Latter-day Saints at Home and Abroad (2005, Religious Studies Center, Brigham Young University,  / )
 When the Saints Come Marching In: A History of the Latter-day Saints in St. Louis (with Thomas L. Farmer) (Orem, Utah: Millenium Press, 2009)
 Gathering to La'ie (with Riley Moore Moffat and Jeffrey N. Walker) (2011, Jonathan Napela Center for Hawaiian and Pacific Studies Brigham Young University - Hawaii) 
 Finding Refuge in El Paso (Springville, Utah: CFI, 2012) 
 Go Ye Into All the World (co-editor with Reid L. Neilson) the compilation of the 2011 BYU Church History Symposium speeches.
 Mormon Yankees: Giants on and off the court (2012)
 Divine Providence: The Wreck and Rescue of the Julia Ann (Springville, Utah: Cedar Fort Inc, 2014)
 In 2016 he co-authorer a guide to Latter-day Saint related historic sites with Mary Jane Woodger and Riley Moffat 
 Kalaupapa: The Mormon Experience in an Exiled Community (Provo, Utah: BYU Religious Studies Center, 2017)
  Melting the Ice: A History of Latter-day Saints in Alaska (Provo, Utah: BYU Studies, 2018)

Woods has been a prolific writer of articles.  Among these are "An Islander's View of a Desert Kingdom: Jonathana Napela recounts his 1869 visit to Salt Lake City".  He published an article on Scottish Mormon migration to Utah in Scotland History in 2005.  He has published books and periodical articles on the exploitation of the Saluda with William G. Hartley.  He has published articles on the first Latter-day Saint missionaries to Tahiti. Another article he published was entitled "The Outdoor Life of Wilford Woodruff" with Phil Murdock. He has also published scholarly articles on The Church of Jesus Christ of Latter-day Saints in Tonga and South Africa.

He has also edited for publication letters of historical significance.  One example of this is "I Long to Breathe the Mountain Air of Zion's Peaceful Home", a letter written by Agnes O'Neal to Brigham Young from war-torn Virginia.  It appeared in BYU Studies in 2007. In May 2014 an article by Woods on the wreck of the Julia Ann carrying Mormons coming from New Zealand bound for Utah, was published by Meridian Magazine.

Public lectures
Woods has given many public lectures.  A few of the most notable include:
His 2007 lecture for the "Faith Beyond Walls" interfaith partnership of St. Louis given at the Frontenac LDS meetinghouse.
A 200th birthday celebration lecture on Oliver Cowdery in Vermont.
He gave a lecture on the place of Liverpool in Mormon migration at the 2007 conference of the European Mormon Studies Association.
In May 2012 Woods gave presentations in Australia regarding the Mormon Yankees basketball players of the 1950s.
In May 2016 Woods gave a lecture commemorating the 147th anniversary of the completion of the Transcontinental Railroad.

Awards
Woods received the Richard L. Anderson Distinguished Research Award in 2002.
Woods received the award for wearing one of the top 3 jackets in Adelaide in 2007.

References

Sources
dustjacket of Woods, Fred E. Gathering to Nauvoo. American Fork, Utah: Covenant Communications, 2002.
Author biography by Deseret Book
Biography of Fred Woods

External links 
 
 Mormon Migration Database

1956 births
20th-century Mormon missionaries
American Mormon missionaries in Australia
Brigham Young University alumni
Brigham Young University faculty
Brigham Young University–Idaho faculty
Church Educational System instructors
Converts to Mormonism
Genealogy and the Church of Jesus Christ of Latter-day Saints
Historians of the Latter Day Saint movement
Living people
University of Missouri–St. Louis people
Historians from California
Place of birth missing (living people)
Historians from Idaho
Latter Day Saints from California
Latter Day Saints from Idaho
Latter Day Saints from Colorado
Latter Day Saints from Utah